Chandala is a Sanskrit word for someone who deals with disposal of corpses, and is a Hindu lower caste, traditionally considered to be untouchable.

A female member of this caste is known as a Caṇḍālī.

History 
Varṇa was a hierarchical social order in ancient India, based on the Vedas. Since the Vedic corpus constitute the earliest literary source, it came to be seen as the origin of caste society. In this view of caste, varṇas were created on a particular occasion and have remained virtually unchanged. In this ordering of society, notions of purity and pollution were central, and activities were delineated in this context. Varṇa divides the society into four groups ordered in a hierarchy; beyond these, outside the system, lies a fifth group known as the untouchables, of which the Chandala became a constituent part.

The first mention of the fourfold varṇa division is found in the later Rigveda. Vedic literature also mentions some groups, such as Ayogava, Chandala, Nishada and Paulkasa, which were outside the four-varṇa classification. They were referred to as belonging to the "panchama varṇa" or panchamas, meaning fifth. The Yajur-veda mentions their degradation from the varṇa classes, mentioning the Chandala group in particular, who were said to be the untouchable class of people born of the union between a Shudra male and a Brahmin female.

There are frequent references to the forest-dwellers in the post-Rigvedic literature; the Chandalas were one of these primitive people, who belonged to the fringes of the society.

In India, except Bengal, Chandal is also used as a pejorative reference to a mean or low person.

Reference by travelers to India
During his travel across India in the 4th-5th centuries CE, Chinese traveler Faxian mentioned Chandalas while talking about the people of India:

See also 
 Tschandala

References

Further reading 
 Anna Dallapiccola, Dictionary of Hindu Lore and Legend, Thames & Hudson, 2004 
Dalit communities
Social groups of Bangladesh
Social groups of India
Social groups of Nepal
Scheduled Castes of Haryana
Scheduled Castes of Delhi
Scheduled Castes of Bihar
Scheduled Castes of Himachal Pradesh
Scheduled Castes of Chhattisgarh
Scheduled Castes of Uttar Pradesh
Scheduled Castes of Gujarat
Scheduled Castes of Daman and Diu
Scheduled Castes of Rajasthan
Scheduled Castes of Jharkhand
Scheduled Castes of Uttarakhand
Social groups of Assam